Vsevolod Romanenko (born 24 March 1977 in Kyiv, in the Ukrainian SSR of the Soviet Union) is a Ukrainian footballer who currently plays for Ukrainian Premier League club FC Volyn Lutsk.

External links

Official Website Zakarpattia Profile
Official Website Karpaty Profile

1977 births
Living people
Footballers from Kyiv
Ukrainian footballers
Association football goalkeepers
FC Obolon-Brovar Kyiv players
FC Dynamo Kyiv players
SC Tavriya Simferopol players
FC Hoverla Uzhhorod players
FC Spartak Ivano-Frankivsk players
FC Volyn Lutsk players
FC Karpaty Lviv players
FC Mariupol players
Ukrainian Premier League players
Ukrainian First League players
Ukrainian Second League players
Ukrainian Amateur Football Championship players